Desde Adentro (English: "From Inside") is the ninth studio album by Peruvian singer-songwriter Gian Marco released by Caracola Records on July 22, 2008. It was his first album released as an independent artist in over a decade. The album was recorded in an unplugged (acoustic) way in three different formats with Gian Marco releasing his own versions of songs that he composed for different artists.

Commercial performance
The album peaked at number 14 on the album charts in Mexico where it sold 10,000 copies and was also certified triple platinum in Perú for selling over 30,000 copies. The album received two nominations at the 2008 Latin Grammy Awards. It is one of the best-selling album in Perú

Track listing
All credits adapted from AllMusic.

Charts

Certifications and sales

Accolades
9th Latin Grammy Awards

|-
|rowspan=2|2008
|style="text-align:center;"|Desde Adentro
|style="text-align:center;"|Best Male Pop Vocal Album
|
|-
|style="text-align:center;"|Todavía
|style="text-align:center;"|Song of the Year
|
|-

References

Gian Marco albums
2008 albums
Spanish-language albums